Verona is a feminine given name and a surname which may refer to:

 Verona Burkhard (1910–2004), American muralist
 Verona Elder (born 1953), British former sprinter
 Verona Murphy (born 1956), Irish politician
 Verona Pooth (born 1968), German television personality and Miss Germany beauty pageant winner
 Verona Rose, English television presenter and actress
 Verona van de Leur (born 1985), Dutch retired artistic gymnast
 Carlos Verona (born 1992), Spanish cyclist
 Eva Verona (1905–1996), Croatian librarian and information scientist
 Guido Verona (pseudonym Guido da Verona) (1881–1939), Italian poet and novelist
 Joana de Verona (born 1989), Brazilian-Portuguese actress

See also
 Maffeo Verona (1576–1618), Italian Renaissance painter
 Altichiero da Verona (c. 1330–c. 1390), Italian Gothic painter
 Guarino da Verona (1374–1460), Italian Renaissance humanist and translator
 Martino da Verona (died 1412), Italian painter
 Michele da Verona (1470–1536/1544), Italian Renaissance painter
 Niccolò da Verona, 15th century Italian Renaissance painter
 Stefano da Verona (c. 1379–c. 1438), Italian painter
 Euprepius of Verona, Catholic saint, first Bishop of Verona
 Milo of Verona, Count (later Margrave) of Verona
 Pacificus of Verona (c. 776–844), Archdeacon of Verona
 Peter of Verona (1206–1252), Catholic saint, priest and inquisitor
 Zeno of Verona (c. 300–371 or 380), Christian saint and either Bishop of Verona or a martyr

Given names
Surnames
English-language feminine given names
Italian feminine given names
Italian-language surnames